Ischnarctia brunnescens is a moth of the subfamily Arctiinae. It is found in Angola, the Democratic Republic of Congo, Malawi and Tanzania.

References

 Natural History Museum Lepidoptera generic names catalog

Nyctemerina